Nature Metabolism is a monthly peer-reviewed academic journal published by Nature Portfolio. It was established in 2019. The editor-in-chief is Christoph Schmitt.

Abstracting and indexing
The journal is abstracted and indexed in:

PubMed/MEDLINE
Science Citation Index Expanded
Scopus

According to the Journal Citation Reports, the journal has a 2021 impact factor of 19.950, ranking it 5th out of 146 journals in the category "Endocrinology & Metabolism".

References

External links

Nature Research academic journals
English-language journals
Physiology journals
Publications established in 2019
Monthly journals
Online-only journals